Rems-Murr-Bühne Leutenbach  is a theatre company based in Leutenbach, Baden-Württemberg, Germany.

Theatre companies in Germany